Stella Barsosio (born 12 March 1993) is a Kenyan long-distance runner. In 2021, she won the Rotterdam Marathon.

On 6 February 2023, it was announced that Barsosio had been banned for two years by Anti-Doping Agency of Kenya after testing positive for trimetazidine. Her suspension was retroactively applied, starting on 17 August 2022.

Career
In 2016, Stella Barsosio won the Belgrade Marathon with a time of 2:43:41.

In 2017, she won the Cracovia Marathon with a time of 2:33:01, and the Skopje Marathon, setting a new course record of 2:33:42.

In 2018, she finished in second place in the Singapore Marathon, and in 2019, she also finished in second place in this event. In 2019, Barsosio won the Sydney Marathon, setting a new course record of 2:24:33, and finished in second place in the Rotterdam Marathon.

Achievements

References

External links 
 

Living people
Year of birth missing (living people)
Place of birth missing (living people)
Kenyan female marathon runners
Kenyan female long-distance runners
21st-century Kenyan women